Hermitage is a town on the island of Carriacou in Grenada.

References

Populated places in Grenada

Populated places in Carriacou and Petite Martinique